Riku Tsuchiya (born 14 December 1997) is a Japanese speed skater.

He won a medal at the 2020 World Single Distances Speed Skating Championships.

References

External links

1997 births
Living people
Japanese male speed skaters
People from Karuizawa, Nagano
World Single Distances Speed Skating Championships medalists
21st-century Japanese people